Ahmed Abdelkader (Arabic: احمد عبدالقادر; born 17 September 1986) is a Libyan footballer who plays for Petrojet as a striker. He played for Libya national football team at 2012 Africa Cup of Nations qualification.

References

External links
 

1986 births
Living people
Libyan footballers
Libya international footballers
Association football forwards